The 2010 Georgia State Panthers football team represented Georgia State University during the 2010 NCAA Division I FCS football season. Georgia State played their first-ever season of football in 2010 and were classified as an independent school, meaning they had no athletic conference affiliation. Bill Curry guided the new program's team to a 6–5 record, while all of their home games are played in the Georgia Dome.

The team's first official practice took place on August 14, 2009, and the team played its first official public spring scrimmage at the Georgia Dome on April 10, 2010, before 3,192 fans. The Panthers played their first football game at home (the Georgia Dome) on September 2, 2010, against Shorter University (Mid-South Conference) (NAIA). In front of a crowd of 30,237 the Panthers won the game 41-7.

The Panthers football program gained national exposure when it played 10th ranked Alabama of the FBS on November 18. Over 100,000 people attended the game held in Bryant–Denny Stadium in Tuscaloosa, and it was broadcast live on the ESPNU television network. Georgia State lost the game 63–7.

Schedule

References

Georgia State
Georgia State Panthers football seasons
Georgia State Panthers football